Richard Latendresse is a Canadian journalist, who is currently the White House Correspondent for Groupe TVA. He was born in Quebec, and currently lives in Washington, D.C.

Foreign correspondent
As a foreign correspondent for the TVA French-language network, he has covered armed conflict including the civil war in the former Yugoslavia (Croatia, Bosnia-Herzegovina, and Kosovo), the toppling of Saddam Hussein, conflict in the West Bank, Afghanistan (both as an embedded journalist with the military and independently), and violent social unrest in Haiti after the overthrowing of its military regime.

Latendresse has also been live on the scene from natural catastrophes including hurricanes Katrina, Rita and Gustav, the tsunami in Thailand, earthquake in Honduras and Nicaragua, and wildfires in California.

September 11 attacks
On September 11, 2001, Latendresse travelled to Washington D.C. where he provided on-site coverage of the aftermath of the terrorist attack.

Latendresse was on the scene at several human tragedies including the shootings at Virginia Tech, the shooting in an Omaha shopping mall that killed eight people, the riots in South Central L.A. after the beating of Rodney King and he covered health-related threats such as the Avian Flu from Hong Kong and Vietnam.

Latendresse's political coverage includes the election of Vladimir Putin as Russian president, newly formed democratic movements in Ivory Coast, Burkina Faso and Togo in Western Africa, and of course, American political events such as the 2004 presidential campaign as well as extended 2008 election coverage.

He has provided Olympics coverage and travelled to host cities including: Barcelona, Lillehammer, Atlanta, Nagano, Sydney, Salt Lake City, Athens, Beijing, and Vancouver.

Latendresse studies journalism at the Centre universitaire d'enseignement du journalisme de Strasbourg, and also has a degree from Montreal's McGill University.

He has a weekly column in the Journal de Montréal, the largest circulation French-language newspaper in North America.

References

External links 

 Twitter
 Latendresse at C-SPAN

Canadian television journalists
Living people
Year of birth missing (living people)
21st-century Canadian journalists
20th-century Canadian journalists
Journalists from Quebec
McGill University alumni